P-Magazine was a Belgian weekly men's magazine produced by Think Media. The magazine was created in 1998 as successor to Panorama/De Post. The headquarters of P-Magazine, published in Dutch, was in Antwerp.

The weekly had an emphasis on humor and glamour photography. Jeroen Denaeghel was the editor-in-chief of the magazine.

In January 2015, the editors of P-Magazine were given police protection following the events of the Charlie Hebdo shootings in Paris.

On 2 October 2015, the last P-Magazine issue was published. The website continued to exist but ownership has changed hands.

References

External links

1998 establishments in Belgium
2015 disestablishments in Belgium
Magazines published in Belgium
Defunct magazines published in Belgium
Dutch-language magazines
Magazines published in Flanders
Humor magazines
Magazines established in 1998
Magazines disestablished in 2015
Mass media in Antwerp
Men's magazines
Photography magazines
Weekly magazines published in Belgium